Open Life Sciences is a  peer-reviewed  open access scientific journal covering all areas of the life sciences. It was established in 2006 as the Central European Journal of Biology and co-published by Versita and Springer Science+Business Media. It obtained its current title in 2014 when it was moved completely to the De Gruyter imprint, at the same time switching to full open access. The editor-in-chief is Mariusz Ratajczak (University of Louisville).

Abstracting and indexing 
The journals is abstracted and indexed in:

According to the Journal Citation Reports, the journal has a 2019 impact factor of 0.690.

References

External links 
 

Biology journals
Publications established in 2006
Monthly journals
English-language journals
Springer Science+Business Media academic journals
Creative Commons Attribution-licensed journals
De Gruyter academic journals